The 2019 SBS Entertainment Awards presented by Seoul Broadcasting System (SBS), took place on December 28, 2019 at SBS Prism Tower in Sangam-dong, Mapo-gu, Seoul. The nominees were chosen from SBS variety, talk and comedy shows that aired from December 2018 to November 2019.

Nominations and winners

Presenters

Special performances

References

External links 
 

Seoul Broadcasting System original programming
SBS Entertainment Awards
2019 television awards
2019 in South Korea